Les Garennes sur Loire (literally Les Garennes on Loire) is a commune in the Maine-et-Loire department of western France. The municipality was established on 15 December 2016 and consists of the former communes of Juigné-sur-Loire and Saint-Jean-des-Mauvrets.

See also 
Communes of the Maine-et-Loire department

References 

Communes of Maine-et-Loire